Kefitzat Haderech (lit. "contraction of the road") is a Hebrew term, used in Jewish sources, referring to miraculous travel between two distant places in a brief time.

Etymology
In modern Hebrew the root kafatz (קפץ) means to jump, suggesting that the traveler has "jumped" to a distant location. However, in the original Talmudic context, the root means "to clench" or "to contract": that is, the route itself is shortened.

In Jewish sources
The Torah has the first reference to kefitzat haderech during the story of Eliezer's  (Avraham's non-Jewish manservant) travels to Ur Kasdim to find a wife for Yitzchak from among Avraham's family, where he eventually finds and leaves with Rivkah (Genesis, 24:42). When Eliezer speaks to Bethuel and Lavan, the father and brother of Rivkah, he states: "I came today to the spring, and I said: O Lord, God of my master Abraham, if You would indeed grant success to the errand on which I am engaged". Rashi states that the usage of "I came today" indicates that "Today I started on my journey and today I have arrived here. Hence we may infer that the earth (the road) shrunk for him (i.e that the journey was shortened in a miraculous manner)" and uses the literal phrase קפיצת הדרך to reference this phenomenon.

The Talmud lists several biblical stories in which, it claims, kefitzat haderech occurred.

The Babylonian Talmud writes that astrologers told Sennacherib "If you go and conquer them now, you will overcome the Jewish people; and if not, you will overcome the Jewish people. He walked and traversed in in one day a road upon which one must walk for ten days in order to traverse it". (Talmud Sanhedrin, 95a)

The Jerusalem Talmud tells the story of a farmer who, chasing his runaway ox, managed to travel from Israel to Babylonia in a single day. It is implied that the farmer accidentally followed a hard-to-find physical shortcut (of a kind not possible according to modern science).

When Natronai Gaon was rumored to have used kefitzat haderech to travel from Babylonia to France and back, Hai Gaon rejected the possibility, and suggested instead that an impersonator may have claimed to be Natronai.

In early stories of the Chasidic movement, wonder-working rabbis are ascribed the ability to reach destinations with unnatural speed.

In Agnon's work 

Shmuel Yosef Agnon, an Israeli writer who won the 1966 Nobel Prize for literature, incorporates this phenomenon into some of his plots. In an Agnon story based on one of the above-mentioned Hasidic folktales, a righteous rabbi is given the gift of kfitzat haderech and uses it to "jump" into the treasuries of the Habsburg Empire, take sacks full of newly minted gold coins, and jump back to his shtetl, unnoticed by anybody. He uses the money to help poor or persecuted Jews, and the story implies that the power would be taken away should he take any of the gold for himself.

Later, when the Emperor plans to make decrees harmful to the Jews, the Rabbi uses his power of kfitzat haderech in order to jump into the audience chamber and beat the Emperor with his stick—being visible (and tangible) to the Emperor himself, but invisible to his councilors and guards.

In science fiction

Frank Herbert's Dune
Science fiction novelist Frank Herbert's concept for a messiah, the Kwisatz Haderach, resembles and is strongly associated with Kefitzat Haderech, the "leap forward". 

Emanuel Lotem's 1989 translation of Dune into Hebrew uses the concepts interchangeably.

While Frank Hebert seems to use the term to reference the messianic personage himself, it's possible that the Golden Path, a major plot point in the later books of the franchise, and the purpose of the Kwitzat Haderach - to steer humanity on the Golden Path, thus 'shortening the path' humanity must take to survive long-term - may be the reason he chose to use the term.

Philip Reeve's Railhead
In his Railhead trilogy science-fiction author Philip Reeve introduced a galactic interstellar railway system, the K-Bahn which is based on a network of K-gates, portal-like gateways utilizing an extradimensional non-space to achieve instant arrival after departure, thus "shortening the way". As explained in the novel Railhead itself, the "K" in this terminology stands for "Kefitzat Haderech", referred to as an expression in "one of the languages of Old Earth".

See also
 Bilocation
 Chukjibeop
 Jump drive
 Lung-gom-pa
 Shukuchi
 Tay al-Ard
 Teleportation
 Teleportation in fiction

References
Notes

Kabbalistic words and phrases
Talmudic mythology
Faster-than-light travel in fiction